Li Zimeng (born 11 July 1977), also known as Li Meng, is a Chinese newsreader for China Central Television, the main state announcer of China.

Li is known all over China as an newsreader for the 7:00 pm CCTV News program Xinwen Lianbo, which has reach all over China on various networks and internationally, is one of the most watched news programs in the world.

Biography
Li was born in Heping District of Shenyang, Liaoning, with her ancestral home in Heze, Shandong, the daughter of Li Zhonglu, a politician who served as the Vice-President of the Shenyang National People's Congress.

Li hosted Xinwen Lianbo since December 2007.

Works

Television
 Culture Express
 World Express
 Xinwen Lianbo

References

1977 births
People from Shenyang
Communication University of China alumni
Living people
CCTV newsreaders and journalists